The 2012 Motocross des Nations was a motocross race held on 29 September and 30 September 2012 in Lommel, Belgium.

Preview 

For the first time in the last few years it looked as though the deep and energy-sapping sands of Lommel may offer up a chance for the European teams to un-seat the United States and end their 7-year winning streak. The Americans entered as reigning champions, but had three riders who had never experienced this sort of sand before. 2012 AMA MX1 Champion, Ryan Dungey led the charge and had been rarely beaten throughout the American season. Blake Baggett, 2012 AMA MX2 champion and Justin Barcia had shown great speed throughout the season, whilst battling each other for the American MX2 crown.

The home team Belgium had three riders who were looking in great form, and most importantly for this event, consistent. Clement Desalle had had an injury free season and was the only real challenger to Tony Cairoli throughout the GP season. The same could be said of MX2 rider Jeremy van Horebeek, who finished in third place in the MX2 Grand Prix and was in his last year riding a 250cc machine before moving up to the MX1 class for 2013. The final member of the team Ken de Dycker had been picked up by KTM in 2012 to stand in for the injured Max Nagl, he stayed with the manufacturer once Nagl had returned and had played second fiddle to his world champion teammate Tony Cairoli throughout much of the season, when it looked as though he had the speed to beat him.

Cairoli himself had won yet another world title, mostly un-opposed, and led the Italian team which contained, Husqvarna factory rider and mid-pack MX2 runner Alessandro Lupino and Marchetti KTM MX1 racer Davide Guarneri. Neither could be described as sand riders though.

The MX2 world champion Jeffrey Herlings had an outside chance of taking to the top-step of the podium, but would have to carry potentially bad results from British Championship MX1 rider Marc de Reuver and fellow MX2 grand prix star Glenn Coldenhoff.

Germany had turned out their strongest team for some years. Max Nagl had spent the majority of the season out injured but came back with a bang in the final few rounds of the year. Ken Roczen had come back from a tough debut year in the United States, but had been picking up form and Markus Schiffer was capable of top 10 MX1 grand prix pace.

Last year's runners up France had a full strength team but weren't great in such deep sand, the same could be said for Great Britain.

Australia finished third in 2011, but where stricken by injuries to both Chad Reed and Brett Metcalfe, along with MX2 GP runner Dean Ferris. This years team consisted wholly of Australian Championship riders, and no-one knew how they would cope.

Injuries were a problem for many other teams. South Africa weren't expected to do as well as last year as they'd lost both Tyla Rattray and Gareth Swanepoel. Spain had lost number 1 rider Jonathan Barragan, Japan had lost both Yoshitaka Atsuta and Akira Narita, Finland legend Antti Pyrhonen had retired and Austria had lost both Pascal Raucheneker and Gunter Schmidiger.

For New Zealand legend and former MX1 world championship runner up Joshua Coppins this would be his last professional event before retirement.

Mongolia were scheduled to return to the MXDN but canceled at the last minute because of logistical reasons. An under-strength Brazil side were flown out to replace them but it was a team without any of its countries top 5 riders.

Entry List 

The entry list is taken from the official Motocross World Championship website.

Note 1: Mongolia did not participate.

Qualifying

Qualified Countries

Countries admitted to the B Final

Non-Qualified Countries

B Final 

Note 1: New Zealand won the B final which meant they qualified for the main races.

Race 

Note 1: Denmark and Switzerland both lost one rider through injury and Finland lost two, their scores are placed differently from the rest of the field who lost no riders.

References 

Motocross des Nations
Motocross